The Owenmore River is a river in County Sligo, Ireland. Its source is in the far south of Sligo, near Gorteen and Lough Gara, from which it runs for 52.3 km to its juncture with the Unshin River near Collooney to form the Ballisodare River.

Tributaries
Owenbeg
Unshin River

Lakes in the catchment
Lough Arrow
Templehouse Lough

References

Rivers of County Sligo